These are the official results of the Men's 200 metres event at the 1987 IAAF World Championships in Rome, Italy. There were a total number of 47 participating athletes, with six qualifying heats and the final held on Thursday 1987-09-03.

Medalists

Records
Existing records at the start of the event.

Final

Semifinals
Held on Thursday 1987-09-03

Quarterfinals
Held on Tuesday 1987-09-01

Qualifying heats
Held on Tuesday 1987-09-01

See also
 1982 Men's European Championships 200 metres (Athens)
 1983 Men's World Championships 200 metres (Helsinki)
 1984 Men's Olympic 200 metres (Los Angeles)
 1986 Men's European Championships 200 metres (Stuttgart)
 1988 Men's Olympic 200 metres (Seoul)
 1990 Men's European Championships 200 metres (Split)
 1991 Men's World Championships 200 metres (Tokyo)

References
 Results

 
200 metres at the World Athletics Championships